Louise Borja Muna is a Guamanian singer, radio host, and politician. Muna serves as a Republican senator in the Guam Legislature from 2017 to 2021.

Early life 
Muna's father was David Rapolla Borja. Muna's mother is Gloria Leddy Wusstig Borja.

Career 
Muna is a former radio host and a former Program Director for KGUM-FM 105.1 The Kat FM.

Muna is a singer with Radiants, a family band in Guam. Muna is also a certified fitness instructor.

In 2016, Muna was a staff member at the Office of Lt. Governor Ray Tenorio.

On November 8, 2016, Muna won the election and became a Republican senator in the Guam Legislature. Muna began her term on January 9, 2017,  in the 34th Guam Legislature. Muna also served as Assistant Minority Whip.

On November 6, 2018, as an incumbent, Muna won the election and continued serving her second term as a senator in the 35th Guam Legislature. Muna also served as an Assistant Minority Leader.

In July 2020, Muna announced that she will not seek another term as a senator in the Guam Legislature.

Personal life 
Muna has two children. Muna and her family live in Dededo, Guam.

References

External links 
 Louisa Borja Muna at ourcampaigns.com
 Louise Muna at rutgers.edu
 The Radiants in facebook.com

Guamanian Republicans
Guamanian singers
Guamanian women in politics
Living people
Members of the Legislature of Guam
People from Dededo
Year of birth missing (living people)
21st-century American women